George Davis  (1876 – 20 September 1937) was a New Zealand politician and trade unionist.

Biography

Early life
Born in England in 1876, Davis sailed to New Zealand as a child settling in Auckland and eventually became a trade unionist. He became the Secretary of the Auckland Drivers' Union in 1899, a position he held until retiring just prior to his death due to ill health. At 38 years of service he was the longest serving union secretary in Auckland. In 1909 he was made a Justice of the Peace.

Political career
Davis contested the 1910 Auckland East by-election as the official candidate of the Labour Party where he came in second place. George Irving McKnight had originally been chosen by the Labour Party, however he proved unsatisfactory. His endorsement was rescinded and Labour chose to sponsor Davis instead. The local prohibition league also endorsed Davis as the Liberal candidate (and eventual winner) Arthur Myers owned a brewery.

Davis was a member of the Auckland City Council serving from 1919 to 1923 and again between 1927 and 1929. Davis was also Chairman of the Auckland Labour Representation Committee.

Death
Davis died in 1937. He was survived by his wife and adult children.

Notes

References

1876 births
1937 deaths
Auckland City Councillors
New Zealand trade unionists
New Zealand people of English descent
People from Auckland
Unsuccessful candidates in the 1919 New Zealand general election
Independent Political Labour League politicians
New Zealand Labour Party (1910) politicians
New Zealand Labour Party politicians
United Labour Party (New Zealand) politicians
New Zealand justices of the peace